is a Japanese politician. He is the incumbent mayor of Kushiro, Hokkaido, Japan.

References

Living people
Mayors of places in Hokkaido
People from Kushiro, Hokkaido
1959 births